Bristol24/7 is an independent online newspaper, generally branded as B24/7, offering news, comment and features for the city of Bristol. As of 2016, it had a print circulation of 20,000, with, on average, 200,000 unique monthly visitors to its website.

History
Founded in 2009 by former The Independent and Western Daily Press journalist Christopher Brown, it was designed as an independent newspaper for Bristol. The following year, fellow Western Daily Press journalist Laura K Williams joined to launch a What's On section.

In 2011 it was voted EDF Energy South West Website of the Year. It retained this title in 2012. In June 2012, it received a commendation as Best Local News Website in the UK at the Online Media Awards.

Bristol24-7 was  sold to Dougal Templeton and Mike Bennett and a new publication, Bristol24/7, was launched as a Community interest company in 2014. Writers from the former Venue Magazine, Spark Magazine and online magazine Bristol Culture joined the company. Editor of Bristol Culture, Martin Booth, joined as co-editor of Bristol24/7 and became editor in November 2014.

Now based at the Paintworks, Arnos Vale, Bristol24/7 publishes content seven days a week from freelance journalists and bloggers from around the city.

Sections include news, business, comment, what's on, food and drink, lifestyle and culture.

References

External links
Official Website
Gaming News

Mass media in Bristol
British news websites
Publications established in 2009